This is a list of Spanish association football (soccer) families.

Families included on the list must have
 at least, one member of the family is capped by a national team on the senior level or an important person in the game of football (e.g., notable coaches, referees, club chairmen, etc.)
 a second member must be a professional player or capped by a national team on the U-17 level or above.

List

A 
 José Luis Ablanedo, Juan Carlos Ablanedo (brother)
  Adalberto, Rodrigo (son)
 José Antonio Agirre, Juan Mari Agirre, Tomas Agirre, Teodoro Agirre, Iñaki Agirre, Ángel Agirre (brothers)
 Marcelino Agirrezabala (Chirri), Chirri II (brother)
 Miguel Albiol, Raúl Albiol (brother)
 Rafael Alkorta Sr. (Alcorta), Rafael Alkorta Jr., Óscar Alkorta (sons)
 Marcos Alonso Imaz (Marquitos), Marcos (son), Marcos Alonso (grandson), Luis Zabala (Marcos Alonso's great-grandfather)
 Periko Alonso, Mikel Alonso, Xabi Alonso (sons)
 Santos Alonso (Santos), Emilín (brother)
 Antonio Alsúa, Rafael Alsúa (brother)
 Antonio Álvarez, Juan Álvarez (brother)
 Manuel Aparicio, Alfonso Aparicio (brother)
 José Agustín Aranzábal (Gaztelu), Agustín Aranzábal (son)
 Luis Arconada, Gonzalo Arconada (brother)
 Serafín Areta, Esteban Areta, José Luis Areta, Jesús María Areta (brothers)
 Eneko Arieta, Antón Arieta (brother)
 Ángel Arocha, Arsenio Arocha (brother)
 Peio Artola, Pedro Artola (brother)
 Gilberto Asensio, Igor Asensio, Marco Asensio (sons)
 Adolfo Atienza, Ángel Atienza (brother)
 Miguel Ayestarán, Antonio Ayestarán (brother)
 Juan Pablo Azpilicueta, César Azpilicueta (brother)

B 
 Manuel Badenes, Virgilio Badenes (brother)
 José Mari Bakero, Santiago Bakero, Jon Bakero (brothers), Itziar Bakero (sister), Jon Bakero (son)
 Rubén Baraja, Javier Baraja (brother)
 Marc Bartra, Èric Bartra (twin brother)
 Estanislau Basora, Joaquín Basora (brother)
 Amador Bernabéu, Gerard Piqué (grandson)
 Antonio Bernabéu, Marcelo Bernabéu, Santiago Bernabéu (brothers)
 Custodio Bienzobas, Paco Bienzobas, Cuqui Bienzobas (brothers)
 Carles Busquets, Sergio Busquets (son)

C 
 José Callejón, Juanmi Callejón (twin brother)
 Juan José Camacho, Luis Camacho (brother), Juanjo Camacho, Ignacio Camacho (sons)
 Sergio Canales, Borja Docal (cousin)
 Santiago Cañizares, Lucas Cañizares (son)
 Paco Castellano, Fernando Castellano (brother) 
 Enrique Castro (Quini), Jesús Castro (brother)
 José Claramunt, Enrique Claramunt (brother)
 Gerardo Clares, Manolo Clares (brother)
 Jesús Clavería, Pablo Clavería (son)
 Antonio Collar, Enrique Collar (brother)
 Quique Costas, Quique Álvarez, Óscar Álvarez (sons)

D 
 Raúl de Tomás (Beni), Raúl de Tomás, Rubén de Tomás (sons)
  Alfredo Di Stefano Sr.,  Alfredo Di Stéfano (son)

E 
  Vicente Engonga Nguema, Vicente Engonga, Julio Engonga, Rafa Engonga, Óscar Engonga (sons),  Igor (grandson/son of Óscar), Joshua Engonga (grandson/son of Julio)

F 
  Bori Fati,  Braima Fati, Ansu Fati (sons)
 Ignacio Fernández (Nacho), Álex Fernández (brother)

G 
 Miguel Gainza, Agustín Gainza (brother)
 Juan Galán, Enrique Galán (brother)
 José García (Moñino), Javi García (son)
 Ángel Garitano (Ondarru), Ander Garitano (brother), Gaizka Garitano (son), Asier Garitano (distant relative)
 Paco Gento, Julio Gento, Antonio Gento (brothers), Paco Llorente, Julio Llorente (nephews), Ramón Grosso (father-in-law of Paco Llorente), Marcos Llorente (son of Paco Llorente)
 José Glaría, Francisco Glaría, Jaime Glaría, Jesús Glaría (brothers)
 Joan Golobart, Román Golobart (son)
 José Ramón González (José Ramón), Fran (brother), Nico González (nephew/son of Fran)
 Miguel González, Míchel (son), Adrián (grandson)
 Raúl González (Raúl), Jorge González (son)
 Juli Gonzalvo, Josep Gonzalvo, Marià Gonzalvo (brothers)
 Adrien Goñi, Iker Muniain (cousin)
 Julen Guerrero, José Félix Guerrero (brother), Julen Jon Guerrero (son) 
 José Guillamón, Fernando Guillamón (brother)
 Dani Güiza, Nuria Bermúdez (former agent and partner/mother of his son, Daniel)
 José María Gutiérrez (Guti), Javi Hernández (cousin)

H 
 Iván Helguera, Luis Helguera (brother)
 Pedro Herrera, Ander Herrera (son)
 Antonio Hierro, Manolo Hierro, Fernando Hierro (brothers)

I 
 Silvestre Igoa, Antonio Igoa (brother)
 Ander Iturraspe, Gorka Iturraspe (brother)

J 
 Gabriel Jorge, Valentín Jorge, Manuel Jorge (brothers)
 Cristóbal Juncal, Urbe Aspas, Jonathan Aspas, Iago Aspas (nephews), Adrián Cruz (nephew), Raúl Blanco (nephew), Aitor Aspas (Aspas brothers' cousin)

K 
 Aitor Karanka, David Karanka (brother)
  Bojan Krkić, Bojan (son),  Lionel Messi (fourth cousin of Bojan Jr.),  Maxi Biancucchi,  Emanuel Biancucchi (cousins of Lionel)

L 
 Amadeo Labarta (Amadeo), Pepito (brother)
 Ricardo Lapetra, Carlos Lapetra (brother), Christian Lapetra (nephew/son of Carlos)
 Joan Laporta, Pol Laporta (son)
 Aymeric Laporte,  Leo Laporte (brother)
 Txomin Larrainzar, Iñigo Larrainzar (brother)
 Francisco Lesmes, Rafael Lesmes (brother)
 Julen Lopetegui, Juan José Maqueda (brother-in-law)
 Sergi López, Juli, Gerard (brothers)
 Luis López Rekarte, Aitor López Rekarte (brother), Maitane López (niece)

M 
 Martín Marculeta, José María Marculeta (brother)
 Álvaro Martínez, Javi Martínez (brother)
 José Martínez (Pirri), Daniel Martínez (son)
 Juan Mata Sr., Juan Mata (son)
  Mazinho, Thiago,  Rafinha (sons)
 Modesto Méndez (Pupi), Brais Méndez (son)
 Andrés Mendieta, Gaizka Mendieta (son)
 Julián Merino, Miguel Merino (brother), Mikel Merino (nephew/son of Miguel)
 Juan José Mieza, Bernabé Mieza (brother)
 Óscar Mingueza, Ariadna Mingueza (sister)

N 
 Joaquín Navarro Perona, Alfonso Navarro Perona (brother)
 Marco Navas, Jesús Navas (brother)

Ñ 
 José Antonio Ñíguez (Boria), Jony, Aarón Ñíguez, Saúl Ñíguez (sons)

O 
 Luis Olaso, Alfonso Olaso (brother)
 Miquel Olmo, Carlos Olmo, Dani Olmo (sons)
 Jesús Orejuela, Diego Orejuela (brother), Antonio Orejuela (cousin)

P 
 José Ramón Palacio,  Rodrigo Palacio (son)
 Luis Ernesto Paños (Luis), Javier Paños (son), Sandra Paños (daughter)
 Alfonso Pérez (Alfonso), Iván Pérez (brother)
 Hernán Pérez, Michu (brother)
 María José Pérez, Ayoze Pérez (cousin)
 Francisco Puado, Javi Puado (son)

Q 
 Jacinto Quincoces, Juan Quincoces Sr. (brother), Juan Quincoces Jr. (nephew/son of Juan Sr.), Juan Carlos Quincoces (nephew)

R 
 René Ramos, Sergio Ramos (brother)
 Luis Regueiro Sr. (Corso), Pedro Regueiro (brother),  Luis Regueiro Jr. (son)
 Miguel Reina, Pepe Reina (son)
 Llorenç Rifé, Joaquim Rifé (brother)
 Eusebio Ríos, Roberto Ríos (son)
 Ricardo Rodríguez (Calo), Severino Rodríguez, César Rodríguez (brothers), Peli (son)
 Txetxu Rojo, José Ángel Rojo (brother)
 Francisco Rufete, Fran Pérez (son)

S 
 Julio Salinas, Patxi Salinas (brother)
 Aurelio Sánchez, Lucas, Ricardo Sánchez, Joaquín (sons)
 Manuel Sanchís, Manolo Sanchís (son)
 Lorenzo Sanz, Paco Sanz, Fernando Sanz (sons), Míchel Salgado (son-in-law)
 Jesús María Satrústegui, Ignacio Satrústegui (brother)
 Agustín Sauto (Bata), José Sauto (brother)
 Marcos Senna,  Márcio Senna (brother),  Marcos Assunção (cousin)
 Félix Sesúmaga, Críspulo Sesúmaga (brother)
 Quique Setién, Laro Setién (son)
 José Suárez, Luis Suárez (brother)
 Néstor Susaeta, Markel Susaeta (cousin)

T 
 Marc Torrejón, Marta Torrejón (sister)
 Fernando Tirapu, Mariano Tirapu (brother), Ainhoa Tirapu (cousin-nephew)
 Mohamed Traoré (Moha), Adama Traoré (brother)

U 
 Fidel Uriarte, Gabriel Uriarte (brother)

V 
 Luis Valle, Joaquín Valle (brother)
 Martí Ventolrà,  José Vantolrá (son)
 José Luis Violeta, José María Violeta (brother)

W 
  Iñaki Williams, Nico Williams (brother)

Z 
 Tomás Zarraonandia, Domingo Zarraonandia, Telmo Zarra (brothers)
 Santi Zubieta, Ángel Zubieta (brother)

See also
List of European association football families

References

Spain